Eli Cohen (born 18 December 1940) is an Israeli actor and film director. In 1989 his film Summer of Aviya won the Silver Bear Award from the 39th Berlin International Film Festival. Six years later, his film Under the Domim Tree was screened in the Un Certain Regard section at the 1995 Cannes Film Festival.

Selected filmography
Director
 Ricochets (Shtei Etzbaot Mi'Tzidon) (1986) 
 Summer of Aviya (1989)
 The Quarrel (1991)
 Under the Domim Tree (1994)

Actor
 Neither by Day Nor by Night (1972)
 Jesus (1979)
 Buzz (1998)

References

External links

1940 births
Living people
Israeli male film actors
Israeli film directors
Israeli male screenwriters